The 1982 SEC Men’s Basketball Tournament took place from March 3–6, 1982 at Rupp Arena in downtown Lexington, Kentucky, home to the University of Kentucky Wildcats men’s basketball team. The Alabama Crimson Tide won the tournament and the SEC’s automatic bid to the 1982 NCAA Division I Men’s Basketball tournament by defeating Kentucky by a score of 48–46. The tournament win was Alabama’s second SEC tournament win, but it was the program’s first tournament win since the 1934 tournament.

Coverage of the entire tournament was produced and regionally syndicated by the TVS Television Network, with NBC covering the championship game for areas outside the SEC geographical footprint.

Bracket

References

SEC men's basketball tournament
1981–82 Southeastern Conference men's basketball season
1982 in sports in Kentucky
Basketball competitions in Lexington, Kentucky
College basketball tournaments in Kentucky